These are the Oricon number one albums of 1998, per the Oricon Albums Chart.

Chart history

Trivia
Number one album of 1998: B'z The Best "Pleasure" by B'z.
Most weeks at number-one: B'z with a total of 7 weeks.

External links
https://web.archive.org/web/20141021000023/http://www.geocities.jp/object_ori/indexa.html

See also
1998 in music

1998 record charts
Lists of number-one albums in Japan
1998 in Japanese music